Heartburn is a burning sensation in the chest.

Heartburn may also refer to:
 Heartburn (novel), a 1983 novel by Nora Ephron
 Heartburn (film), a 1986 Mike Nichols comedy-drama film based on the novel
 Heartburn (album), a 1976 album by Kevin Coyne
 "Heartburn", a song from Just Jack's 2002 album The Outer Marker
 "Heartburn", a song from Alicia Keys' 2003 album The Diary of Alicia Keys
 "Heart Burn", an episode from season 18 of Family Guy